The Landing Historic District is a national historic district located at Fort Wayne, Indiana.  The district encompasses 18 contributing buildings and 1 contributing structure in the central business district of Fort Wayne. The area was developed between about 1868 and 1943, and includes notable examples of Renaissance Revival, Romanesque Revival, and Italianate style commercial architecture.  Located in the district is the separately listed Randall Building. Other notable buildings include the Keystone Block, Fisher Brothers Paper Building (1914), The Bash Building (1895), and The Pinex Company Building (1917).

It was listed on the National Register of Historic Places in 1993.

References

Commercial buildings on the National Register of Historic Places in Indiana
Historic districts on the National Register of Historic Places in Indiana
Italianate architecture in Indiana
Romanesque Revival architecture in Indiana
Renaissance Revival architecture in Indiana
Buildings and structures in Fort Wayne, Indiana
National Register of Historic Places in Fort Wayne, Indiana